Baldwin Lake State Fish and Wildlife Area is an Illinois state park on  in Randolph and St. Clair County, Illinois, United States.

References

State parks of Illinois
Protected areas of St. Clair County, Illinois
Protected areas of Randolph County, Illinois